The ninth series of the British medical drama television series Holby City commenced airing in the United Kingdom on BBC One on 24 October 2006, and concluded on 9 October 2007.

Episodes

Cast

Main characters 

Rakie Ayola as Kyla Tyson
Adam Best as Matt Parker (until episode 24)
Paul Bradley as Elliot Hope
Tom Chambers as Sam Strachan
Sharon D. Clarke as Lola Griffin
Ade Edmondson as Abra Durant (until episode 14, episodes 32–52)
Paul Henshall as Dean West (until episode 24)
Tina Hobley as Chrissie Williams (until episode 17, from episode 29)
Jaye Jacobs as Donna Jackson

Patsy Kensit as Faye Byrne (from episode 18)

Rosie Marcel as Jac Naylor
Sharon Maughan as Tricia Williams (until episode 6)
Amanda Mealing as Connie Beauchamp
Patricia Potter as Diane Lloyd (episodes 1–38)
Robert Powell as Mark Williams
Hugh Quarshie as Ric Griffin (until episode 4, from episode 22)
Luke Roberts as Joseph Byrne
Phoebe Thomas as Maria Kendall (from episode 7)
Peter Wingfield as Dan Clifford (from episode 7)

Recurring and guest characters 
Stella Gonet as Jayne Grayson (from episode 39)
Ginny Holder as Thandie Abebe-Griffin (episodes 22–43)
Andrew Lewis as Paul Rose
Alex Macqueen as Keith Greene
Patrick Toomey as Christopher Sutherland (until episode 37)

References

09
2006 British television seasons
2007 British television seasons